Mitchell Dixon (born 4 January 1990 in Sydney, New South Wales) is an Australian freestyle, backstroke swimmer.

At the 2010 Australian Short Course Swimming Championships, Dixon finished 6th in the final of the 200 metre freestyle and first in the B-final of the 400 metre freestyle. At the conclusion of the meet, Dixon was named as part of a 30-man squad to compete at the 2010 World Short Course Championships in Dubai. One of five debutants, Dixon became the 701st swimmer to represent Australia at a senior international meet. At the World Championships, Dixon placed 31st in the 400 metre freestyle and alongside Tommaso D'Orsogna, Patrick Murphy and Kyle Richardson placed 5th in the final of the 4 × 200 metre freestyle relay.

The following year at the 2011 Summer Universiade, Dixon with David McKeon, Kristopher Taylor and Nic Ffrost won bronze in the 4 × 200 metre freestyle relay.

References

1990 births
Living people
Australian male backstroke swimmers
Swimmers from Sydney
Australian male freestyle swimmers
Universiade medalists in swimming
Universiade bronze medalists for Australia
Medalists at the 2011 Summer Universiade
21st-century Australian people